The 2000 Italian motorcycle Grand Prix was the sixth race of the 2000 Grand Prix motorcycle racing season. It took place on 28 May 2000 at the Autodromo Internazionale del Mugello.

500 cc classification

250 cc classification

125 cc classification

Championship standings after the race (500cc)

Below are the standings for the top five riders and constructors after round six has concluded. 

Riders' Championship standings

Constructors' Championship standings

 Note: Only the top five positions are included for both sets of standings.

References

Italian motorcycle Grand Prix
Italian
Motorcycle Grand Prix